Mike Brodeur (born March 30, 1983) is a Canadian former professional ice hockey goaltender. He was selected by the Chicago Blackhawks in the 2003 NHL Entry Draft and played in the National Hockey League (NHL) with the Ottawa Senators.

Playing career
Brodeur had a breakout AHL campaign with the Rochester Americans in 2008–09, when he posted an 18-13-4 record with a 2.45 goals against average and .921 save percentage, all career bests.

Brodeur signed a one-year contract with the NHL Ottawa Senators during the summer of 2009, but at training camp, Brodeur was returned to the AHL, assigned to the Binghamton Senators. Brodeur was recalled to Ottawa on November 24, 2009, after an injury to Senators' starting goaltender Pascal Leclaire. He made his NHL debut on December 19, 2009, against the Minnesota Wild, stopping 22 shots and backstopping Ottawa to a 4–1 win. He was returned to Binghamton afterwards. On January 14, 2010, Brodeur was called up from Binghamton only hours before the opening faceoff for the Ottawa Senators. Brodeur made 32 stops for a 2–0 shutout of the New York Rangers in only his second ever NHL game. Brodeur finished his NHL career appearing in 7 games over two seasons, with a record of 3 wins and 1 loss.

On March 15, 2012, Brodeur signed with the Las Vegas Wranglers of the ECHL. March 23 was his first full game in more than a year following offseason hip surgery. He lost that game to the Idaho Steelheads, 3–2, in a shootout.

Personal life
Brodeur is married. He is a distant relative of former New Jersey Devils goaltender Martin Brodeur.

He lost his home in the Alberta 2016 Fort McMurray wildfire forest fire near Fort McMurray in May 2016.

Career statistics

Regular season and playoffs

References

External links
 

1983 births
Living people
Augusta Lynx players
Binghamton Senators players
Camrose Kodiaks players
Canadian expatriate ice hockey players in the United States
Canadian ice hockey goaltenders
Chicago Blackhawks draft picks
Elmira Jackals (ECHL) players
Greenville Grrrowl players
Houston Aeros (1994–2013) players
Las Vegas Wranglers players
Moose Jaw Warriors players
Norfolk Admirals players
Orlando Solar Bears (ECHL) players
Ottawa Senators players
Pensacola Ice Pilots players
Rochester Americans players
Rockford IceHogs (AHL) players
Ice hockey people from Calgary
Toledo Storm players